Salamiyah Subdistrict  is a Syrian nahiyah (subdistrict) located in Salamiyah District in Hama.  According to the Syria Central Bureau of Statistics (CBS), Salamiyah Subdistrict had a population of 115300 in the 2004 census.

References 

Salamiyah
Salamiyah District